Class 15 may refer to:

British Rail Class 15
DRG Class 15, which was used twice by the Deutsche Reichsbahn in its classification of steam locomotives:
In 1925 for the Bavarian S 2/6 express locomotive
In 1938 following the Anschluss of Austria for the Austrian Class 10 of the Federal Railway of Austria (BBÖ)